Chicago Storm may refer to:

 Chicago Storm (soccer), a defunct professional soccer team that played in Chicago, Illinois
 Chicago Storm (softball), a defunct professional softball team that played in Chicago, Illinois